Patrick Muyaya Katembwe, (born July 10, 1982) is a Congolese politician. He has served as a member of the National Assembly of the Democratic Republic of Congo since 2011. Since 2021 he is the government spokesman.

Early life 
Patrick Muyaya was born July 10, 1982, in Kinshasa. He grew up in the commune of Bandalungwa, in Funa District.

Muyaya studied communications at the University of Kinshasa. He received his degree in journalism in 2009. He later obtained a certificate in democratic management in fragile states through the International Republican Institute's "Rising Stars" program in 2014.

Muyaya began his career as a reporter and journalist for CEBS TV, a local television channel operating in Kinshasa, where he eventually served as president of the board of directors.

Personal life 
Muyaya is married to Benoitte Muyaya and has three children.

Political career 
Muyaya began his political career in 2005 when he joined the staff of Pius Isoyongo Lofete, second rapporteur for the transitional national assembly. He later became Lofete's political advisor, serving in that post until 2006. In 2007, he became a communications advisor for the Cabinet of Prime Minister Antoine Gizenga.

One year later, he became principal advisor in charge of communications and the press for the Prime Minister's office under Adolphe Muzito, occupying that post until 2011.

Member of Parliament 
In the 2011 Democratic Republic of the Congo general election Muyaya was elected a member of parliament for Kinshasa Funa 2 district. He was elected on the party list of the Unified Lumumbist Party.

Muyaya was re-elected in the 2018 Democratic Republic of the Congo general election.

Government spokesman 
In April 2021 he was appointed as government spokesman in the new DRC government.

Other political activities 
He served as first secretary of the office of the rapporteur for the provisional bureau of the National Assembly from February to April 2012, and later served as assistant rapporteur for the Foreign Relations commission of the National Assembly.

Since July 2016, he is also the leader of the Network of Young Parliamentarians of the Democratic Republic of Congo.

In July 2016, Muyaya was invited to attend the 2016 Democratic National Convention in Philadelphia as a guest of the National Democratic Institute for International Affairs

Muyaya worked with the United States Department of State in January 2015 on a pre-election mediation mission.

Muyaya served as an election observer for the 2013 presidential election in Mali with the support of the International Republican Institute.

References 

Members of the National Assembly (Democratic Republic of the Congo)
1982 births
People from Kinshasa
Unified Lumumbist Party politicians
Living people
University of Kinshasa alumni